Lopeti Timani (born 28 September 1990) is a professional rugby union player. His usual position  is second row or number 8. After two seasons with the NSW Waratahs in Super Rugby, he signed on to play for the Melbourne Rebels in 2014. He now plays for Cardiff Rugby in Wales.

He played 12 times for Australia in 2016, and in 2021 played for Tonga, becoming the first player to represent a second national team since World Rugby changed its eligibiity rules.

Early life
Lopeti Timani was born in the Tongan village of Navutoka. His older brothers Sione Timani and Sitaleki Timani are both international rugby players.

He attended Tonga College 'Atele on Tonga. In 2008 he was selected for Tonga's under-20s rugby world championship team at the age of 17, but could not play because of the minimum age limit of 18 imposed by the International Rugby Board.

At age 18 he moved to Australia and switched codes, playing rugby league for the Canterbury-Bankstown Bulldogs in the NRL's Toyota Cup competition in 2009 and 2010.

Rugby union career
In 2011, Timani returned to rugby union, joining the Junior Waratahs professional squad where he played in the Pacific Rugby Cup. He played for the Southern Districts Rugby Club in the Shute Shield, where he developed his ability to play at lock in addition to the back row.

He signed an extended player squad contract with the Waratahs for the 2012 season, and made his Super Rugby debut against the Reds in round one. He played against the British & Irish Lions in 2013.

Timani signed with the Melbourne Rebels for the 2014 and 2015 seasons.

In 2016, Timani debuted for Australia against Argentina in Perth before getting his run on debut against Argentina at Twickenham Stadium in London. This was seen as Timani's break out game as he continued as starting no.8 for his next 4 appearances.

Timani recommitted to Australia Rugby until 2019 turning down lucrative offers form Europe.

In August 2018, Timani travels to France to join Top 14 side La Rochelle ahead of the 2018-19 season. Lopeti played for La Rochelle for the 2018-2019, 2019-2020 & 2020-2021 seasons. La Rochelle made the final of the  European Challenge Cup & the semi-final of the Top 14 in 2018-2019 season. In the 2020-2021 season La Rochelle made the final of the European Championship Cup & the final of the Top 14.

Timani has signed with Toulon in the Top 14 for the 2021-2022 season.

In June Timani debuted for the Tonga sevens team at the Monaco Sevens tournament alongside Malakai Fekitoa, transferring his international affiliation from Australia to Tonga. On 6 November 2021 Timani made his test debut for Tonga in a 69-3 defeat by England as part of the 2021 Autumn Nations Series

On 27 April 2022, Timani and Cardiff Rugby confirmed that the number-8 will play for the URC team from the 2022-23 season onwards.

Super Rugby statistics

Reference list

External links
 Rebels Profile

1990 births
Living people
Tongan emigrants to Australia
Australian rugby union players
Tongan rugby union players
Rugby union number eights
Rugby union flankers
New South Wales Waratahs players
Melbourne Rebels players
Melbourne Rising players
Australia international rugby union players
Tonga international rugby union players
Rugby union locks
Stade Rochelais players
Australian expatriate rugby union players
Expatriate rugby union players in France
RC Toulonnais players
Cardiff Rugby players
Expatriate rugby union players in Wales